Trevor Eyster, formerly known as Tim Eyster, is an American actor. He is best known for his role as Eugene "Sponge" Harris on the television program Salute Your Shorts, which aired from 1991 to 1992 on Nickelodeon. The role garnered him a  Young Artist Award nomination for "Best Young Actor Co-Starring in a Cable Series".

Early life
Eyster was born Timothy Richard Eyster in Tarzana, California, and grew up in Chatsworth and Dana Point, California. He attended Dana Hills High School, and became an emancipated minor in 1996. In 2002, he legally changed his first name to Trevor.

Career

Eyster began his career at the age of 9, on an episode of the soap opera Santa Barbara in 1987. He thereafter appeared in a number of television episodes, two TV films, and two feature films through 1992. As a voice actor he also performed in Disney's 25-minute animated featurette The Prince and the Pauper (1990). In 1991, he played Ray Krebbs' son Jock in the Dallas series finale "Conundrum".

His best-known role as a child actor was starring in the role of Eugene "Sponge" Harris on the two-season Nickelodeon television series Salute Your Shorts (1991–1992). In 1992 he was nominated for a Young Artist Award for "Best Young Actor Co-Starring in a Cable Series" for the role. Since 2010 Eyster has appeared in various reunion gatherings of the show's stars.

After the Salute Your Shorts series was discontinued in 1992, except for a role in an episode of Babylon 5 in 1998, Eyster took a 21-year break from screen acting, resuming in 2013 as an adult actor after changing his first name from Tim to Trevor. As an adult he has appeared in a number of short films, done small roles in television series and TV films, and starred in his own self-produced docudrama series.

Activism
In 2011, Eyster founded the non-profit organization "...and then, Angels descended", an empathy-driven, micro-volunteering organization which seeks to bridge the empathy deficit. His organization was granted 501(c)(3) status by the IRS in 2012. The organization pairs volunteer "angels" with those who reach out for help through the organization's website.

In 2016, he created the docudrama miniseries SpongeyLeaks after he discovered his disabled aunt was being abused by her state-paid In-Home Supportive Services (IHSS) caregiver. The series documents the events that happened after Eyster discovered the abuse and neglect that was occurring, and also examines the issue of elder abuse and dependent adult abuse. The SpongeyLeaks webisode series premiered December 19, 2016. In January 2017, Eyster appeared on The Dee Armstrong Show to discuss elder abuse and disabled-adult abuse.

Major filmography

Television

Film

References

Further reading
Klickstein, Mathew. Slimed!: An Oral History of Nickelodeon's Golden Age. Penguin Books, 2013.

External links
 
 

1978 births
20th-century American male actors
21st-century American male actors
American male child actors
American male film actors
American male television actors
Male actors from California
Living people
Television male child actors
American activists
American nonprofit executives